Jonathan Gray may refer to:
Herbert Adams (novelist) (1874–1958), used the pseudonym Jonathan Gray
Spike (musician) (Jonathan Gray, born 1968), English rock frontman, songwriter and vocalist
Jonathan Gray (cricketer) (born 1967), English cricketer
Jonathan Gray (editor), English editor
Jonathan D. Gray (born 1970), Global Head of Real Estate of Blackstone Group
Jonathan Gray (born 1980), French-American film producer

See also
John Gray (disambiguation)
John Grey (disambiguation)
Jon Gray (born 1991), baseball player
Johnathan Gray (born 1993), American football player